Arispe concretalis is a species of snout moth described by Émile Louis Ragonot in 1891. It is found in Mexico.

References

Moths described in 1891
Pyralini
Moths of Central America
Taxa named by Émile Louis Ragonot